Ana Diamond (born August 1996) is a British political commentator and human rights activist who is one of the founding members of The Alliance Against State Hostage Taking. The organization was formally founded in New York on 24th September 2019, on the sideline of the United Nations General Assembly.

Diamond traveled to Iran in August 2014 and was placed on a travel ban for reasons undisclosed to her at the time. After 500 days, in January 2016 Diamond was arrested by the Islamic Revolutionary Guard Corps (IRGC) at the height of the JCPOA deal. At the age of 19, she was wrongly accused of espionage for MI6, CIA, and Mossad - allegations she denied. Her arrest, similar to the arrest of numerous other dual-nationals, has been linked to the long-standing dispute of estimated £400m between Islamic Republic of Iran and United Kingdom.

Early life and education 
Ana Diamond was born in Sir, West Azerbaijan's Palace and moved to Finland with her parents when she was a toddler and went to Ressu International Baccalaureate School in Helsinki. She later returned to the United Kingdom with her family and grew up in London. She studied Film Studies and Theology at King's College London, graduating with First-Class Honours in 2019. She is of British descent and holds British and Finnish citizenships. Diamond's paternal great-great-grandparents were English missionaries who traveled to Iran in the 19th century. They settled in Urmia, Iran, home to one of the earliest Christian churches, the Assyrian Church of the East, and the site of the first American Christian mission in Iran in 1835.

Diamond has stated in her interviews that she became a member of the Conservative Party (UK) at the age of 16 and was one of the spokespersons for the Young Conservatives (UK) in London from 2011 until her travel ban in Iran in 2014. She was a campaigner in 2012 London mayoral election for Boris Johnson with other YC members such as Ben Howlett (politician) and Jacob Young (politician), appearing in photos with Johnson and David Cameron, Britain's then-Prime Minister; many of these were used as evidence for the MI6 spying allegations she later faced in Iran.

Arrest and detention 
Diamond travelled to the United States as part of the University of California Education Abroad Program and studied a semester at University of California, Santa Barbara before going on a pilgrimage to Israel in July 2014. She documented the co-existence of the Jewish, Christian and Muslim people in the Old City, Jerusalem, which was one of the alleged evidences later used by Islamic Revolutionary Guard Corps to prove her "spy work" for MI6 and Mossad. 

On 12 January 2016, she was formally arrested with her parents after approximately 500 days of travel ban. During this period, she had been subjected to extensive interrogations by the Islamic Revolutionary Guard Corps. Diamond spent roughly 200 days in solitary confinement in the high-security 2-A IRGC solitary units in Evin Prison. Diamond was briefly transferred to the public ward, where she met prominent female political prisoners, including Narges Mohammadi and Atena Farghadani. At the time, Diamond was the youngest female inmate in Evin Prison and one of the few dual-nationals to undergo a forced virginity test during detention, as well as a mock execution. Diamond has described her treatment as "demeaning" and as "torture".

Unlike other political and national security prisoners, Diamond was tried at the Special Clerical Court due to her high-profile family clerical background. Her primary prosecutor was Ebrahim Raisi, later a presidential candidate in 2017 Iranian presidential election running against President Hassan Rouhani. After 15 months of travel ban and 6 months detention, Diamond was charged with "espionage", "collaboration with the hostile government of England and MI6, and others" and apostasy. At the end of the trial, she was found guilty and was sentenced to death.

Release 
In August 2016, Diamond was released on bail pending trial in excess of about £130,000. She was placed on house arrest and subsequently her sentence commuted to 10 years. In November 2017, following a first official visit to Iran by the British Foreign Secretary Boris Johnson, all charges against her were dropped, and in May 2018 she was able to flee Iran with an emergency passport and return to London.

In September 2019, Diamond became one of the founding members of The Alliance Against State Hostage Taking, alongside Richard Ratcliffe, Nazanin Zaghari-Ratcliffe's husband, Jason Rezaian and Nizar Zakka. The Alliance was launched at the 74th United Nations General Assembly in New York City in 2019. Since the launch of the Alliance, Diamond has collaborated on a documentary with BBC Panorama to highlight that the arrest of dual and foreign nationals in Iran is often associated with the aim of extracting money.

Since her return to the UK, Diamond has been open about the psychological trauma inflicted on her and the physical damages that she developed during her detention, one of them being a severe cardiac arrhythmia.

Health issues 
Since her return to the UK, Diamond has been open about the psychological trauma inflicted on her and the physical damages that she developed during her detention, one of them being a severe cardiac arrhythmia. From being put in stress positions to being forced to listen to the looped cries of other inmates, she has discussed openly about the experience of being a torture survivor, including undergoing two heart operations within a year after her return. When speaking with the i newspaper, she said:

Of course the realisation that you might be taken and killed at any minute is very sobering, and in a way has been a pivotal factor in how I’ve been able to bounce forward [...] I have this renewed sense of ‘I need to make the most of my life’ because I almost lost it. When I was in prison, I was in the company of great women, highly skilled and very qualified women; a Nobel peace prize nominee, some top lawyers. These are not people you just come across in the normal world. I looked at them and I could see their soul and integrity is so far from being crushed, they’re so alive. They would hold these weekly seminars on law, philosophy, social anthropology, and teach new inmates. They’d take the role of a lecturer. Coming out of that place and doing anything less than your very best would have been looked down on by the women whose company I was fortunate enough to have. I think part of me is doing it for them.

Scholarship to University of Oxford 

Diamond is a mentee of Terry Waite, an envoy for the Church of England and a former hostage negotiator. Waite was himself a hostage in Lebanon for five years, and helped Diamond to recover from her ordeal following her release. “The most important thing he taught me was that I should try to use this time of imprisonment creatively and look at it as something that strengthens my character," she has said of her mentor. She has stated that Waite played a significant role in her recovery and helped her regain her confidence. In 2021, Diamond was accepted to study at Balliol College, Oxford with a scholarship. She announced on Twitter that she was a 2021 finalist for the Rhodes Scholarship from the Global category.

In an interview with Emma Barnett of the BBC Woman's Hour, Diamond spoke about her experience and what she had learned from it by quoting the French novelist André Malraux: "None of us walk through hell and come back empty handed."

Activism 

In September 2019, Diamond became one of the founding members of The Alliance Against State Hostage Taking, alongside Richard Ratcliffe, Nazanin Zaghari-Ratcliffe's husband, Jason Rezaian, and Nizar Zakka. The Alliance was launched at the 74th United Nations General Assembly in New York City in 2019. She has also worked closely with Freedom from Torture and Hostage UK in understanding the trauma of returning hostages and their rights to demand enforceable reparation, including restitution, compensation, and rehabilitation.

Since the launch of the Alliance, Diamond has collaborated on a documentary with BBC Panorama to highlight that the arrest of dual and foreign nationals in Iran is often associated with the aim of extracting money, facilitating prisoner exchanges, lifting of sanctions, repayment of arms debts or other concessions. On 4 September, two weeks after the release of the documentary, the British Defence Secretary Ben Wallace (politician) acknowledged for the first time that the payment of the £400 million UK-Iran debt could help secure the release of remaining British dual nationals in Iran. However, the following day, Iran's Foreign Ministry spokesperson rejected any links between the disputed debt and the arrest of dual nationals, considering the two issues 'separate matters'. He said the UK government is in debt to Iran "no matter whether a UK government official acknowledges the debt or not."

Diamond was one of the first individuals to speak out on the aggravating conditions of Kylie Moore-Gilbert's incarceration in Evin Prison and her prolonged detention in solitary confinement. She has described how extended periods of solitary confinement can cause "irrational rage, self-loathing, self-harming thoughts, paranoia, hallucinations," and are "so detrimental to one's body and mental health."

In July 2020, with Nasrin Sotoudeh's husband, Reza Khandan, Diamond reported that Moore-Gilbert had been transferred from Evin to Qarchak prison as a "form of punishment". Following a lengthy but successful campaign for Dr Moore-Gilbert's release, Diamond gave an interview to the Guardian and said that “The Iranian Revolutionary Guards Corps have been practising and perfecting their state hostage-taking for many decades now," and that she is working on a "legal path to hold Iran accountable for their atrocious violations of human rights and the deliberate and planned acts of kidnapping and torture of foreign nationals."

In October 2020, she spoke on a panel about Hostage Diplomacy alongside Alistair Burt, former British Minister of State for Middle East and North Africa (2017–2019); Patrick Wintour, the Diplomatic Editor of the Guardian; Xiyue Wang, a former hostage and a scholar at Princeton University; and Sanam Vakil, the Deputy Head of Chatham House Middle East and North Africa Programme.

Since the launch of the Alliance, Diamond has collaborated on a documentary with BBC Panorama to highlight that the arrest of dual and foreign nationals in Iran is often associated with the aim of extracting money, facilitating prisoner exchanges, lifting of sanctions, repayment of arms debts or other concessions.

Letter to the Supreme Leader of Iran  

In September 2020, in the week leading up to the holy day of Ashura, Diamond wrote an open letter in both English and Persian to the Supreme Leader of Iran, Ayatollah Seyyed Ali Khamenei, and urged him to intervene in the new criminal case brought against Nazanin Zaghari-Ratcliffe. She sharply contrasted the religious ideology of the Islamic Republic with its counterproductive practices and wrote that:

 The Islamic Iran that once professed to honour the legacy of Imam Ali (PBUH) and Hazrateh Fatimah (PBUH) and sought to lead by the example of the Imamat has sadly become so distracted by international power conflicts and media wars that it has forgotten its foundational principles. Your Excellency, our Shi’a Imams were killed for their steadfast adherence to justice. Imam Hossein (PBUH) and his 72 family members were martyred because of their dedication to eradicating tyranny and ending oppression [...] I trust you to understand that these actions, if even slightly miscalculated, will in equal measure diminish Iran's legitimacy not only in the international political arena but also in the religious circles. 

Her letter was controversial to some human rights activists because it was considered as sanitising Islamic Republic's negative human rights record. However, it was well-received by others and circulated in the Persian-language broadcasters, including Radio Zamaneh. In her letter, she wrote briefly about her late-grandfather, Ayatollah Gholamreza Hassani, who was the first and longest-serving Imam of Masjid-e-Jamé mosque of the city of Urmia in northwest Iran after the Islamic Revolution in 1979.

See also 

 Iran–United Kingdom relations
 List of foreign nationals detained in Iran
 List of hostage crises
 Terry Waite
 Hostage International

References 

Prisoners and detainees of Iran
Iranian women activists
Iranian prisoners and detainees
Finnish human rights activists
Iranian people of British descent
Alumni of King's College London
1994 births
Living people
Naturalized citizens of Finland
Iranian emigrants to Finland
Iranian expatriates in the United States
Finnish expatriates in the United States
Finnish people of British descent
Inmates of Evin Prison